Gisela Kaplan  is an Australian ethologist who primarily specialises in ornithology and primatology. She is a professor emeritus in animal behaviour at the University of New England, Australia, and also honorary professor of the Queensland Brain Institute.

Academic career

Kaplan graduated from Monash University with a Doctor of Philosophy.

She published her first book with Clive Kessler, Hannah Arendt: Thinking, Judging, Freedom in 1989, followed by Contemporary Western European Feminism in 1990. In 2005, she submitted a second thesis, titled Vocal behaviour of Australian magpies (Gymnorhina tibicen).

In 2011, Kaplan was awarded an honorary Doctorate of Science by the University of New England. In 2015, she was conferred honorary fellow of the American Ornithological Society. The following year, she was awarded the status of emeritus professor by the University of New England. She also received the Whitley Award in Behavioural Zoology for her book Bird Minds in 2017.

She has given interviews for ABC Radio.

In March 2021 Kaplan was elected Fellow of the Royal Society of New South Wales.

Personal life 
In the 1990s, she began hand-raising and rehabilitating native birds, which she continues to do in her spare time.<ref></ref

Publications
Kaplan has published over 250 research articles and 23 books in total; since 2000 predominantly focussing on animal vocal behaviour, communication and cognition specifically in birds and primates.

Books

 Kaplan, G. (2019) Bird Bonds. Sex, mate-choice and cognition in Australian native birds. Macmillan Australia, Sydney.  368 pp  https://www.panmacmillan.com.au/9781760554200/gkaplan/
Kaplan, Gisela (2019) Australian Magpie: Biology and Behaviour of an Unusual Songbird. 2nd edition, CSIRO Publishing, Melbourne.  pbk. 280 pp
Kaplan, Gisela (2007, 2018) Tawny Frogmouth. 2nd ed., CSIRO, Melbourne.  pbk.168 pp
Kaplan Gisela (2015) Bird Minds. Cognition and behaviour of Australian native species. CSIRO Publishing, Melbourne.  286 pp
Kaplan, Gisela (2004, 2005, 2008) Australian Magpie: Biology and Behaviour of an Unusual Songbird. Natural History Series, University of New South Wales Press, Sydney & CSIRO 1st ed., Melbourne.  pbk.142 pp
Kaplan, G (2005) The Vocal Behaviour of Australian Magpies (Gymnorhina tibicen): A Study of Vocal Development, Song Learning, Communication and Mimicry in the Australian Magpie. PhD thesis, School of Veterinary Sciences, University of Queensland, St. Lucia, Brisbane.
Rogers, Lesley J. and Kaplan, Gisela eds. (2004) Comparative Vertebrate Cognition: Are Primates Superior to Non-primates?  Kluwer Primatology Series: Developments in Primatology: Progress and Prospect. Kluwer Academic /Plenum Publishers, New York, Boston, Dordrecht, London, Moscow.   Hbk, 386 pp
Kaplan, G (2003) Famous Australian Birds. Allen & Unwin, Melbourne.   Hbk 48 pp
Kaplan, G and Rogers, LJ (2001) Birds. Their Habits and Skills, Allen & Unwin, Sydney. , 272 pp
Kaplan, G and Rogers, L.J. (2000) The Orang-utans. Their Evolution, Behavior, and Future. Perseus Publishing, Cambridge, Mass.  (re-edited from 1999), 191 pp
Rogers, L.J. and Kaplan, G (2000) Songs, Roars and Rituals. Communication in birds, mammals and other animals. Harvard University Press, Cambridge (completely rev. version of 1998 pub. Not Only Roars and Rituals). , 207 pp
Kaplan, G and Rogers, LJ (1994) Orang-Utans in Borneo, University of New England Press. , 196 pp

Selected book chapters 

 Rogers, LJ and Kaplan G (2019) Does functional lateralization in birds have any implications for their welfare? Special Issue: Brain Functional Lateralization in Animals. (Ed. A. Quaranta). Symmetry, 11, 1043; doi:10.3390/sym11081043
 Kaplan, G (2018). Passerine Cognition. (10,000-word entry): In: Encyclopedia of Animal Cognition and Behavior. Ed. by Jennifer Vonk, Todd K. Shackelford, Springer International Publishing AG/Nature, 6330 Cham, Switzerland
 Kaplan, G (2016) Don Quixote's Windmills. Ch. 14 in Thinking about Animals in the Age of the Anthropocene. (eds. M. Tønnessen, K. Armstrong-Oma and S. Rattasepp) pp. 284–305. Lexington Books (imprint of Rowman & Littlefield). New York, London.
 Kaplan, G (2008). The Australian Magpie (Gymnorhina tibicen): An alternative model for the study of songbird neurobiology. In P. Zeigler and P. Marler (eds). The Neuroscience of Birdsong. Cambridge University Press, Cambridge,UK,  pp. 153–170.
 Rogers, LJ and Kaplan, G (2005). An Eye for a Predator: Lateralization in birds, with particular reference to the Australian magpie (Gymnorhina tibicen). Behavioral and Morphological Asymmetries in Vertebrates, eds. Yegor Malashichev and Wallace Deckel. Landes Bioscience, Georgetown,TX.  (online)
 Kaplan, G and Rogers, LJ (2004) Charles Darwin and animal behavior. In M. Bekoff and Jane Goodall (eds.) Encyclopedia of Animal Behavior. 3 vols, Greenwood Publishing, Westport, CT, vol.2, pp. 471–479 (introductory essay to vol.2).
 Kaplan, G (2004) Magpie Mimicry. In M. Bekoff and Jane Goodall (eds.) Encyclopedia of Animal Behavior. 3 vols., Greenwood Publishing, Westport, CT, vol.2, pp. 772–774
 Rogers, LJ and Kaplan, G (2004) All animals are not equal: the interface between scientific knowledge and the legislation for animal rights. In: CR Sunstein and M Nussbaum (eds.) Animal Rights: Law and Policy. Oxford University Press, Oxford, pp. 175–204.
  In Rogers, LJ and Kaplan, G (eds) Comparative Vertebrate Cognition: Are Primates Superior to Nonprimates? Kluwer Primatology Series: Developments in Primatology: Progress and Prospect. Kluwer Academic /Plenum Publishers, New York.
 Kaplan, G (1998). Economic Development and Ecotourism in Malaysia. The Shaping of Malaysia. Eds. A Kaur & I Metcalfe, St. Martin's Press. London, New York. 
  In: Kaur A., Metcalfe I. (eds) The Shaping of Malaysia. Studies in the Economies of East and South-East Asia. Palgrave Macmillan, London  
  In RD Nader, B Galdikas, L Sheehan & N Rosen (eds.) The Neglected Ape. Plenum Press, New York

References

External links
"Talking magpies, grieving tawny frogmouths and canny galahs": Gisela Kaplan in conversation with Sarah Kanowski

Living people
Australian women academics
Academic staff of the University of New England (Australia)
University of Queensland alumni
Year of birth missing (living people)
Fellows of the Royal Society of New South Wales